Konsum is a cooperative retail chain founded in 1945 by the Soviet Military Administration in occupied East Germany. It consisted of grocery stores, retail markets, industrial plants, and restaurants, and was a direct competitor to the Handelsorganisation.

After German reunification in 1990, Konsum was not dissolved, as it was not a state-owned enterprise like Handelsorganisation. Today, it exists in limited capacity, mostly as a real estate management cooperative.

References

Organisations based in East Germany
East Germany–Soviet Union relations
Retail companies of the Soviet Union
1945 establishments in Germany
Conglomerate companies established in 1945
Companies of East Germany
German companies established in 1945
Retail companies established in 1945